The Takao Railway Museum is a museum in Gushan District, Kaohsiung, Taiwan.

History

The museum was formerly the Kaohsiung Harbor Station, built during the Japanese period. In 2003, the station building was designated a historical building by the Kaohsiung City Government. 

On 9 November 2008, the last train departed from the station at 5.30 p.m. After the station closure, the Railway Culture Society managed the station as the Takao Railway Museum. The museum is currently part of the Kaohsiung Museum of History.

Architecture
The museum building was built in a classic Japanese style with a Chinese hip style roof. Area in front of the station was planted in huge coconut trees.

Exhibition
The museum provides books about railroads and exhibitions of relics from the age of rail.

Locomotives

The following locomotives are on static display outdoors.

● Steam Passenger Locomotive CT259, which is a Pacific-type (4-6-2 Whyte classification) tender locomotive.  It was made in Japan circa 1935, during the Japanese colonial period of Taiwan.  It is an example of the Japanese National Railway (JNR)  Class C55.

● Steam Freight Locomotive DT609, which is a Consolidation-type (2-8-0 Whyte classification) tender locomotive.  It was made in Japan circa 1920s, during the Japanese colonial period of Taiwan.  It is an example of the Japanese National Railway (JNR) Class 9600.

● Taiwan Power Company (TaiPower) diesel locomotive number L02, previously used at LinKou Power Station.

● Taiwan Power Company (TaiPower) diesel locomotive number L03.

Transportation
The museum is accessible within walking distance east from Sizihwan Station of the Kaohsiung MRT Orange Line.

See also
 List of museums in Taiwan

References

External links

 

2010 establishments in Taiwan
Gushan District
Museums established in 2010
Museums in Kaohsiung
Railway museums in Taiwan